Allard may refer to:

 Allard (surname), people with the surname Allard
 Allard Motor Company
 Allard River, river in Quebec
 Allard, Edmonton
 Peter A. Allard School of Law, the law school of the University of British Columbia

Given name
 Allard Anthony (1620–1685), Dutch alderman
 Allard Baird (born 1961), baseball executive
 Allard H. Gasque (1873–1938), U.S. Representative from South Carolina
 Allard K. Lowenstein (1929–1980), politician
 Allard Oosterhuis (1902–1967), Dutch resistance hero 
 Allard Pierson (1831–1896), Dutch theologian
 Allard de Ridder (1887–1966), Dutch–Canadian conductor, violist, and composer
 Allard Roen (1921–2008), American businessman
 Allard van der Scheer (actor), Dutch actor